Charles Egon III of Fürstenberg (German: Karl Egon III. Leopold Maria Wilhelm Maximilian Fürst zu Fürstenberg; 4 March 1820 – 15 March 1892) was an officer in the armies of the Grand Duchy of Baden and the Kingdom of Prussia, rising to Cavalry General. He was born in Donaueschingen, the son of Charles Egon II, Prince of Fürstenberg and Amalie of Baden. From 1854 to 1892 he was also the senior member of the Swabian line of the House of Fürstenberg. Due to his extensive estates he was a member of the Prussian House of Lords, the upper chamber of Baden and the upper chamber of the Estates of Württemberg. From 1864 to 1892 he was president of the Association of German Standesherren. He died in Paris and was succeeded by his son Charles Egon IV.

Bibliography
 Kurt von Priesdorff: Soldatisches Führertum. Band 8, Hanseatische Verlagsanstalt Hamburg, ohne Jahr, S. 151.
     
 C. F. Gutmann: Carl Egon III Fürst zu Fürstenberg. in: Schriften des Vereins für Geschichte und Naturgeschichte der Baar und der angrenzenden Landesteile in Donaueschingen. VIII. Heft 1893, Tübingen 1893. S. 1–44. online (PDF; 22,9 MB)

1820 births
1892 deaths
German princes
German hunters
Prussian Army personnel
Members of the Prussian House of Lords
Charles Egon III
Knights of the Golden Fleece of Austria